The Thanks of Congress is a series of formal resolutions passed by the United States Congress originally to extend the government's formal thanks for significant victories or impressive actions by American military commanders and their troops. Although it began during the American Revolutionary War, the practice peaked during the American Civil War. Similarly, the Confederate Congress also passed resolutions honoring extraordinary performance to individuals or military units.

Early years
During the American Revolution, the official Thanks of Congress from the Continental Congress was often accompanied by a specially struck commemorative gold or silver medal.  Among the recipients were George Washington, Horatio Gates, John Eager Howard, John Stark, Baron von Steuben, and Henry Lee (See also List of Congressional Gold Medal recipients).

Other recipients in the early years of the United States include all participants in the Battle of Tippecanoe (1811), Alexander Macomb (War of 1812) (1814), Oliver Hazard Perry (War of 1812) (1814), James Lawrence (War of 1812) (1814), Charles Gratiot in the same war, and Andrew Jackson (epilogue to the War of 1812) (1815), William Henry Harrison (1818) and Zachary Taylor (1847).

American Civil War
During the American Civil War, the Thanks of Congress were joint resolutions of Congress which were published in the Statutes at Large to honor officers from late 1861 through May 1866 for significant victories or impressive actions. A total of thirty officers were named in these acts during the war, fifteen in the Union Army and fifteen in the Union Navy. Because the Thanks of Congress was only awarded to officers, the Medal of Honor was created at this time to honor soldiers in the Army, and over 1,500 men received the medal by the end of the war. Only one officer, General Ulysses S. Grant, received both the Thanks of Congress and a Congressional Gold Medal during the Civil War.

The first citation during the American Civil War recognized "the gallant and patriotic services of the late Brig. Gen. Nathaniel Lyon, and the officers and soldiers under his command at the Battle of Wilson's Creek, 10 Aug. 1861." Admiral David Dixon Porter was honored the most, on four occasions.

Civil War recipients

Others
Later honorees included Admiral of the Navy George Dewey (1898) and Captain Arthur Rostron, for his captaining of the SS Kroonland (1914). In 1914, the Thanks of Congress were given to three Latin American diplomats: Domício da Gama, Rómulo Sebastián Naón, and Eduardo Suárez Mujica, for their work at the Niagara Falls peace conference which helped avert a war with Mexico. In 1915, they were extended to members of the Isthmian Canal Commission. In 1919 Congress thanked General of the Armies John J. Pershing at a special joint session. In August 1962 Congress thanked General of the Army Douglas MacArthur at a special joint session.

See also
 Congressional Gold Medal
 Medal of Honor

Notes

References

 

 
 United States Statutes at Large. Available from: LexisNexis Congressional; Accessed: 2009-10-15.
 

Military history of the American Civil War
Politics of the American Civil War
Legislative branch of the United States government
Government of the Confederate States of America
Lists related to the United States Congress